Vansittart Island, also known as Gun Carriage Island, is a granite island with an area of . The island is part of Tasmania's Vansittart Island Group, lying in eastern Bass Strait between Flinders and Cape Barren Islands in the Furneaux Group.

It is partly private property and partly leasehold land and is currently used for grazing Wiltshire Horn sheep. The island is part of the Franklin Sound Islands Important Bird Area, identified as such by BirdLife International because it holds over 1% of the world populations of six bird species.

History of colonial times
Former Bass Strait sealers were living on the island by the 1820s. In 1831 George Robinson came to evict the sealers and their families as he wanted to establish an Aboriginal settlement (see Section 5 below) on the island. When the Aboriginal establishment proved unsuccessful the sealers and their families returned to the island. Their community had grown to 28 people by the time Bishop Nixon came to visit in 1854.
"Vansittart" is a significant maritime name within private and naval vessels, linked to the East India Company where Henry Vansittart was Governor of Bengal from 1759 to 1764.
In that year 1842 HMS Beagle returned to Van Diemens Land following a reverse circumference of Australia, via Timor and Swan River, Western Australia; Lt John Lort Stokes was affirmed as captain following the departure of then Cpt Wickham at Brisbane for reasons of sickness. Beagle was destined to join the Van Diemens Land government's cutter the Vansittart (seconded from the Van Diemens Land Government as tender to HMS Beagle) for the NE charting of Tasmania and the Bass Strait.  Following which in the Bass Strait - Flinders Group of islands, "Gun Carriage Island" (named by sealers) was officially named "Vansittart Island".
Originally the vessel Vansittart was a private sloop with two cannon arriving from London and Cowes into Hobart Town, Van Diemens Land with eight souls aboard on 30 January 1836. Following arrival, within days Vansittart was sharing the harbour with HMS Beagle when Captain Robert Fitzroy and Charles Darwin with Lt Wickham berthed on 5 February 1836 on their reverse circumference of the globe, establishing the Theory of Evolution. This was the first of two considerably notable meetings between the two vessels. Vansittart traded between Hobart Town, Sydney, Kangaroo Island and Launceston prior to purchase by the colonial government of Van Diemens Land (renamed Tasmania 1856) on 22 February 1837 for "search and rescue".
Vansittart frequently visited Port Arthur and progressed to be a government revenue cutter and is purported to have transported the last Aboriginals from the main island of Van Diemens Land to the Flinders Group for a failed resettlement. Vansittart was lost at sea when sailing from Sydney to California as a private vessel under Master Gill 1849, the California Gold Rush had started in 1848.

Flora and fauna
Most of the original vegetation of the island has been cleared by the use of fire and by bulldozers with chains, destroying many stands of Oyster Bay pine.

Recorded breeding seabird and wader species are little penguin, Pacific gull, sooty oystercatcher and pied oystercatcher. Black swans have nested on the island, which is also a refuge for Cape Barren geese. Reptiles present include tiger snake, copperhead snake, white-lipped grass snake, southern grass skink, metallic skink and Bougainville's skink. Echidnas are present, though the Tasmanian pademelon is extinct there.

See also

 List of islands of Tasmania

References

Furneaux Group
Important Bird Areas of Tasmania
Islands of North East Tasmania